Hjelme Church is a parish church of the Church of Norway in Øygarden Municipality in Vestland county, Norway. It is located in the central part of the island of Seløyna. It is one of the three churches in the Hjelme og Blomvåg parish which is part of the Vesthordland prosti (deanery) in the Diocese of Bjørgvin. The white, concrete church was built in a rectangular design in 1971 using plans drawn up by the architect Arne S. Halvorsen. The church seats about 340 people.

History

The Old Hjelme Church was built in 1875 to serve the northern part of what is now Øygarden. In the late 1960s, the parish wanted a newer, larger church. It was decided to build a new church on the main road, closer to the main population center on Hellesøyna. Arne Halvorsen was hired to design the new church. The church was built in 1970-1971. It was consecrated on 13 June 1971 by the Bishop Per Juvkam.

See also
List of churches in Bjørgvin

References

Øygarden
Churches in Vestland
Rectangular churches in Norway
Concrete churches in Norway
20th-century Church of Norway church buildings
Churches completed in 1971
1971 establishments in Norway